Rywałd  is a village in the administrative district of Gmina Radzyń Chełmiński, within Grudziądz County, Kuyavian-Pomeranian Voivodeship, in north-central Poland.

The village has a population of 420.

During the German occupation of Poland (World War II), several Poles from Rywałd, Radzyń Chełmiński and other nearby settlements were imprisoned in the local monastery, before being massacred in the nearby village of Stara Ruda.

References

Villages in Grudziądz County